Zaw Hlaing Thein is a Burmese politician  who currently serves as a Sagaing Region Hluttaw MP for Sagaing Township No.2. He is a member of the National League for Democracy.

Early life and education 
Zaw was born in Sagaing, Myanmar on February 13, 1990. He graduated from Technological University, Sagaing of AGTI (Mechanical Power).

Political career

He joined the NLD in 2011. For the first time, he was appointed as the Sagaing Region Youth charge by the NLD Youth Congress. In 2015, he was served as a member of the General Election Victory Committee. He also served as a member of the Central Youth Leading Committee at the 2017 NLD Youth Conference.

In the 2020 Myanmar general election, he was elected as Sagaing Region Hluttaw MP and elected representative from Sagaing Township no.2 parliamentary constituency.

References

1990 births
Living people
People from Sagaing Region